Kellar is a German surname. Notable people with the surname include:

Becky Kellar-Duke (born 1954), Canadian ice hockey player
George C. Kellar (1879–1954), American politician
Harry Kellar (1849–1922), American magician (born "Heinrich Keller")
Mark Kellar (born 1952), American football player
Scott Kellar (born 1963), American football player

See also
McKellar

German-language surnames